Francisco Antonio Córdoba Escarpeta (born September 8, 1988) is a Colombian footballer who currently plays for Deportivo Pereira.

Career
Cordoba began playing in his native Colombia from 2008 with Deportivo Pereira, also having spells with Independiente Medellín, Cúcuta Deportivo, Atlético Huila and La Equidad, before moving to the United States in 2015 with United Soccer League club Charlotte Independence.

References

1988 births
Living people
Colombian footballers
Categoría Primera A players
Deportivo Pereira footballers
Independiente Medellín footballers
Cúcuta Deportivo footballers
Atlético Huila footballers
La Equidad footballers
Charlotte Independence players
Colombian expatriate footballers
Expatriate soccer players in the United States
Soccer players from Colorado
Association football defenders
USL Championship players
People from Risaralda Department